Ouargaye is a town located in the province of Koulpélogo in Burkina Faso. It is the capital of Koulpélogo Province. Ouargaye is twinned with Fougères in Brittany, France

References 

Populated places in the Centre-Ouest Region
Koulpélogo Province